Ifeanyi Frederick Onuigbo (born November 22, 1989 in Lagos) is a Nigerian footballer, currently playing as a striker for Hanoi T&T F.C.

Career
He started his career with Heartland F.C. He signed than for Hilal in Sudan, before moving to Ahly in January 2009.

He was named by goal.com in their African Leagues' Team of the Week for his performance against CS Sfaxien in the first leg of the North African Cup Winners Cup Final.

International career
Onuigbo presented Nigeria at the FIFA Beach Soccer World Cup 2007 in Brazil.

References 

1989 births
Living people
Nigerian footballers
Expatriate footballers in Libya
Expatriate footballers in Sudan
Nigerian expatriate sportspeople in Sudan
Heartland F.C. players
Nigerian expatriates in Libya
Al-Hilal Club (Omdurman) players
Association football forwards